Senator Oliver may refer to:

Allen J. Oliver (1903–1953), New York State Senate
Edward C. Oliver (born 1930), Minnesota State Senate
George T. Oliver (1848–1917),  U.S. Senator from Pennsylvania
S. Addison Oliver (1833–1912), Iowa State Senate
William M. Oliver (1792–1863), New York State Senate